Argentia Beach is a summer village in Alberta, Canada. It is located on the northern shore of Pigeon Lake.

Demographics 

See also 
List of communities in Alberta
List of summer villages in Alberta
List of resort villages in Saskatchewan

References

External links 

1967 establishments in Alberta
Summer villages in Alberta